RC Slovan Bratislava is a Slovak rugby club based in Bratislava. They currently play in the Czech KB První Liga, with the other Slovak clubs only competing in sevens.

The club currently provides the majority of players to the national team, with the rest playing for Czech clubs.

History
The club was founded in 2003.

Competitions
The club plays currently in Slovak league, including Rugby Klub Bratislava, Rugby Club Piestany,  Trnava Rugby Club, Zilina Rugby Club, and Kosice Rugby Club.

References

External links
 RC Slovan Bratislava

Slovak rugby union teams
Sport in Bratislava
Rugby clubs established in 2003
2003 establishments in Slovakia